James DeRuyter Blackwell (18 March 1828 – 5 September 1901) of Warrenton, Virginia is a celebrated author and poet of the American Civil War era.  He attended Randolph-Macon College and graduated from Dickinson College.  He studied and practiced law before serving in the Army of the Confederacy and was honorably discharged in 1864.  He gave up law due to health reasons and devoted his life to literature.  His experiences from the Civil War can be seen in much of his work as published in his "The Poetical Works of J. Der. Blackwell, 1879, E. J. Hale and Son, New York" which has been in print for over 130 years.  It contains such poems as "The Dead Drummer Boy", "The Unknown Grave" and "Forget Not the Dead". The poem "War" specifically mentions the battles along the Rappahannock River in Virginia, considered the eastern boundary between the Union and Confederate States of America.  In "War", he describes the bloody battles and the internal conflicts associated with glory and death.  Blackwell is often read or quoted in Memorial and Veterans Day observances.

References
 Papers held in the Swem Library, College of William and Mary, Williamsburg, Virginia
 The Poetical Works of James DeRuyter Blackwell, Volume 1, 1879, E. J. Hale and Son, New York

External links
 Google books entry

1828 births
1901 deaths
Poets from Virginia
Confederate States Army soldiers
Dickinson College alumni
19th-century American poets
American male poets
19th-century American male writers
People from Warrenton, Virginia
People of Virginia in the American Civil War
Randolph–Macon College alumni